Normalized frequency can refer to:
 Normalized frequency (digital signal processing)
 Normalized frequency (fiber optics), also known as V number